Andy Schleck–CP NVST–Immo Losch is a Luxembourg-based road cycling team, that was formed in 2018 for riders under the age of 18. The following year, the team moved up to a national level, before registering with the Union Cycliste Internationale (UCI) as a Women's Continental Team for the 2021 season.

Team roster

Major results
2021
Asker Cyclo-cross, Mie Ottestad

National champions
2021
 New Zealand Track (Team pursuit), Rylee McMullen
 Switzerland Track (Elimination race), Fabienne Buri
 Norwegian Cyclo-cross, Mie Ottestad

2022
 Switzerland Track (Elimination race), Fabienne Buri
 Switzerland Track (Omnium), Léna Mettraux
 Switzerland Track (Points race), Léna Mettraux
 South Africa Track (Elimination race), Kerry Jonker
 Luxembourg U23 Time Trial, Nina Berton
 Luxembourg U23 Road Race, Nina Berton

References

External links

Cycling teams based in Luxembourg
Cycling teams established in 2018